Jean-Baptiste Meyer (7 April 1894 – 26 March 1976) was a Luxembourgian footballer. He played in nine matches for the Luxembourg national football team from 1923 to 1928. He was also part of Luxembourg's squad for the football tournament at the 1928 Summer Olympics, but he did not play in any matches.

References

External links
 

1894 births
1976 deaths
Luxembourgian footballers
Luxembourg international footballers
Place of birth missing
Association football defenders
CA Spora Luxembourg players